"Tiff" is a song by Nigerian singer-songwriter Simi. Produced by Oscar, the song is regarded as Simi's breakthrough into mainstream entertainment.

Background
Tiff was released on 9 June 2014 as the first of two singles, with the later titled "E No Go Funny". The video for the song was directed by Josh Clarke and was uploaded to YouTube on 30 August 2014.

Critical reception
Upon its release, "Tiff" was met with positive reviews amongst music critics. The song was nominated in the "Best Alternative Song" category at The Headies 2015.

Awards and nominations

References

External links

2014 songs
Simi (singer) songs